Shō, Sho or Shou is a masculine Japanese given name. Notable people with the name include:

 Akiko Yosano (与謝野 晶子, 1878-1942), Japanese author. Her birth name was "Shō Hō" (鳳 志よう)
, Japanese footballer
, Japanese freestyle skier
 Sho Kosugi (ショー・コスギ, born 1948), Japanese martial artist and actor
 Show Hayami (速水 奨, born 1958), Japanese voice actor and singer
, Japanese idol and actor
, Japanese baseball player
, Japanese footballer
, Japanese boxer
 Sho Nakata (中田 翔, born 1989), Japanese baseball player
 Sun Yat-sen (孫 逸仙, 1866–1925), a.k.a. "Nakayama Shō" (中山 樵)
, Japanese diver
 Sho Sakurai (櫻井 翔, born 1982), Japanese idol, singer-songwriter, and newscaster
, stage name Lien, Japanese idol, member of South Korean boy band Mirae
, Japanese swimmer
, Japanese professional wrestler
 Sho Yano (矢野 祥, born 1991), American child prodigy
Shō Kiryūin (鬼龍院 翔, born 1984) Japanese singer and songwriter, member of Japanese rock band Golden Bomber
 Sho Yonashiro (與那城 奨, born 1995), Japanese idol, member of JO1
 Sho Watanabe (渡辺翔), Japanese wheelchair racer

Fictional characters
 Ginzu the Ninja or Sho, a character in Captain Commando video game
 Sho, a protagonist of the 2002 video game Crimson Sea
 Syoh from Tuff E Nuff (Dead Dance)
 Genocide Jack (Genocider Syo), a character in Danganronpa: Trigger Happy Havoc
 Shou Amabane, the player character in Burning Rangers
 Shou Ashikawa, a character in Machine Robo Rescue
 Shō Fukamachi, the protagonist character of Bio Booster Armor Guyver
 Sho Hayate, a character in Dengeki Sentai Changeman
 Shō Kazamatsuri, the main character in Whistle!
 Syo Kurusu (来栖 翔), main character in Uta no Prince-sama: Maji Love 1000%, Uta no Prince-sama Maji Love 2000% and Uta no Prince-sama Maji Love Revolutions
 Sho Marufuji (Syrus Truesdale), a character in Yu-Gi-Oh! GX
 Sho Minamimoto, an antagonist in The World Ends with You video game
 Sho Minazuki, a fighter in Persona 4: The Ultimax Ultra Suplex Hold
 Sho Shinjo, a character in the Battle Arena Toshinden fighting game series
 Sho Takamatsu, a character from The Drifting Classroom
 Shou Tatsumi, a character in Kyuukyuu Sentai GoGoFive
 Sho Tsukioka (月岡 彰), a character in the novel, manga, and film Battle Royale
 Shou Tucker, a character in Fullmetal Alchemist
, a character in the anime series SSSS.Gridman
 Shō Kusakabe, a character from the anime and manga series  Fire Force

See also 
 Masatoshi Ono (小野 正利, born 1967), Japanese rock/heavy metal singer, nicknamed "Sho"
 Sho (disambiguation)

Japanese masculine given names